Cecil Scott Grow (born May 5, 1948) is an American politician and religious leader and has been the State Senator for Idaho's District 14 since his appointment in August 2018. Grow has been a general authority of the Church of Jesus Christ of Latter-day Saints (LDS Church) since 2005.

Early life, education, and career
Grow was born in Moscow, Idaho, and grew up in Boise, Idaho. As a young man, he was a missionary in the LDS Church's Southeast Mexican Mission. After his mission, Grow received a bachelor's degree in accounting from Brigham Young University. He then worked for several accounting firms before founding his own accounting partnership.

LDS Church service
Grow has served in the LDS Church as a counselor in a stake presidency, stake president and regional representative. From 1988 to 1991, he was president of the church's Uruguay Montevideo Mission. As an area seventy from 1995 to 2005 he was in the presidency of both the church's North America Northwest and Idaho areas. During this time, he was president of the Idaho Area from 2001 to 2003, one of only three non-general authorities to have served as an area president (the others being Enrique R. Falabella, during the same time period, and Aleksey Samaykin, beginning in 2022).

In 2005, Grow became a member of the First Quorum of the Seventy where he has served as a counselor and as president of the Mexico North Area, as well as a counselor in the Mexico Area. Grow also served as a counselor in the presidency of the South America Northwest Area. In 2016, Grow participated with Dieter F. Uchtdorf in a ceremonial cornerstone sealing at the new Fort Collins Colorado Temple.

On October 6, 2018, Grow was designated an emeritus general authority.

Idaho Senate
Grow serves on the following Senate committees: Finance, and Local Government and Taxation.

Elections

2018 
In February 2018, Grow announced his candidacy to run for the senate seat in Idaho Legislative District 14 after the incumbent, Marv Hagedorn, announced he was seeking the Republican nomination for lieutenant governor, instead of running for reelection.

Hagedorn resigned before the end of his term after Governor Butch Otter appointed him to serve in his administration.  In August 2018, the Legislative District 14 Republican Central Committee sent three names in order of preference to Otter to fill the vacancy, with Grow as their first recommendation. On August 15, 2018, Otter appointed Grow to serve the remainder of Hagedorn's term.

Grow defeated Ted Hill, Todd Hatfield, Darin J. Driscoll, Natalie Feuerstein, and write in Julie Looney with 35.2% of the vote in the Republican primary.

Grow defeated Democratic nominee Richard Boozel with 69.6% of the vote in the general election.

2020 
Grow defeated Ted Hill again in the Republican primary with 52.65% of the vote. Grow defeated Ellen B. Spencer an Independent candidate but affiliated with Democratic party with 73% of the vote in the general election.

Personal life
Grow is married to Rhonda Lee Patten and they are the parents of eight children. In 2012, Grow helped plan a large-scale reunion of more than 3,000 descendants of noted Salt Lake Valley architect Henry Grow, best known for designing and constructing the roof of the Salt Lake City Tabernacle on Temple Square.

See also 
 Deseret Morning News 2008 Church Almanac (Salt Lake City, Utah: Deseret Morning News, 2007) p. 45
 Idaho Secretary of State Candidate List (last updated 2/6/2018)

References

External links 
 Senator C. Scott Grow: Official site
 General Authorities and General Officers: C. Scott Grow
 Grampa Bill's G.A. Pages: C. Scott Grow

1948 births
Living people
American general authorities (LDS Church)
American Mormon missionaries in Mexico
People from Boise, Idaho
American Mormon missionaries in Uruguay
American accountants
Members of the First Quorum of the Seventy (LDS Church)
Brigham Young University alumni
Area seventies (LDS Church)
American business executives
20th-century Mormon missionaries
People from Moscow, Idaho
Religious leaders from Idaho
Latter Day Saints from Idaho
Republican Party Idaho state senators
21st-century American politicians
Regional representatives of the Twelve
Mission presidents (LDS Church)